The 1914 Michigan gubernatorial election was held on November 3, 1914. Incumbent Democrat Woodbridge N. Ferris defeated Republican candidate Chase S. Osborn with 48.15% of the vote.

General election

Candidates
Major party candidates
Woodbridge N. Ferris, Democratic
Chase S. Osborn, Republican
Other candidates
Henry R. Pattengill, Progressive
James Hoogerhyde, Socialist
Charles N. Eayrs, Prohibition
Herman Richter, Socialist Labor
W. M. Harris, Unaffiliated

Results

References

1914
Michigan
Gubernatorial
November 1914 events